Bellisarius was built in South Carolina in 1762 or 1779, possibly under another name. Between 1789 and 1799 she made six complete voyages as a whaler in the British southern whale fishery. Afterwards she sailed as a merchantman. She was last listed in 1809.

Career
Bellisarius first appeared in Lloyd's Register (LR) in 1789. James Mather purchased her to use her as a whaler.

1st whaling voyage (1789–1790): Captain Thomas Anderson sailed from London on 29 June 1789. Bellisarius returned on 26 April 1790.

2nd whaling voyage (1790–1791): Captain Anderson sailed on 29 July 1790. Bellisarius returned on 27 September 1791.

3rd whaling voyage (1791–1792): Captain Anderson sailed on 11 November 1791, bound for Peru. Bellisarius returned on 2 June 1793 with 148 tuns of sperm oil and 25 tuns of whale oil.
 
After the outbreak of war with France, Captain Thomas Anderson acquired a letter of marque on 29 August 1793.

4th whaling voyage (1797–1799): Captain Anderson sailed from England in 1793. Bellisarius returned from Peru on 29 November 1795 with 107 tuns of sperm oil, 98 tuns of whale oil, 75 cwt of whale bone, and 3800 seal skins.

6th whaling voyage (1797–1799): Captain William Dagg sailed from England on 16 November 1797. Belissarius was reported to have been at Walwich (Walvis) Bay on 6 August 1798. She returned to England on 8 February 1799 with 75 CWT of whale bone, and 3,700 seal skins.

Fate
Bellisarius was last listed in Lloyd's Register and the Register of Shipping in 1809.

Notes

Citations

1762 ships
Ships built in South Carolina
Age of Sail merchant ships of England
Whaling ships